Babu Lal Mahere is an Indian politician and member of the Bharatiya Janata Party. Mahere is a member of the Madhya Pradesh Legislative Assembly from the Ujjain Dakshin constituency in Ujjain district.

References 

People from Ujjain
Bharatiya Janata Party politicians from Madhya Pradesh
Madhya Pradesh MLAs 1990–1992
Living people
Year of birth missing (living people)